Steve Cooper (born 10 December 1979) is a Welsh professional football manager and former player. He is currently the head coach of  club Nottingham Forest.

Cooper began his coaching career at Wrexham's academy while playing as a defender in the Welsh football leagues. He moved to Liverpool in 2008 and was appointed manager of their academy in 2011. Cooper joined the England youth set-up in 2014, initially coaching the U16s, before winning the 2017 FIFA U-17 World Cup with the U17s. He became head coach of Swansea City in 2019 and Nottingham Forest in 2021.

Early life
Cooper was born on 10 December 1979 in Pontypridd, Wales, and raised in nearby Hopkinstown. He is the son of Welsh former football referee Keith Cooper. As a youngster, Cooper played football in the Rhondda leagues and was a Liverpool supporter.

Playing career
In the late 1990s, Cooper joined Wrexham but did not make an appearance for the club. He was signed by manager Brian Flynn, who suggested Cooper pursue a coaching career instead of playing professionally. Cooper later played for Total Network Solutions, Rhyl, Bangor City and Porthmadog in the Welsh football leagues. He featured for Bangor City in the UEFA Cup against FK Sartid Smederevo in 2002.

Managerial career

Early coaching
While a player, Cooper studied for his coaching badges and began coaching at Wrexham's academy. At the age of 27, Cooper obtained his UEFA Pro Licence, becoming one of the youngest coaches to achieve the qualification. 

After several years coaching at Wrexham's academy, Cooper became the club's head of youth development. On 3 September 2008, Cooper was appointed as a youth coach at Liverpool, initially taking charge of the under-12s. On 18 July 2011, he was named manager of Liverpool's academy. Cooper coached the under-18s for the 2012–13 season, leading them to the semi-finals of the FA Youth Cup, where they lost to Chelsea. While at Liverpool, Cooper oversaw the development of such players as Raheem Sterling, Trent Alexander-Arnold and Ben Woodburn. In 2013, Cooper joined the FA as a youth coach educator and also taught on the FA Wales A Licence course.

England youth
On 13 October 2014, Cooper was appointed as manager of the England national under-16 team. The following year, he took charge of the under-17s, coaching players such as Jadon Sancho, Phil Foden and Callum Hudson-Odoi. Cooper led his side to the final of the 2017 UEFA European U17 Championship, where they lost to Spain 4–1 on penalties following a 2–2 draw. Cooper's U17s then won the 2017 FIFA U17 World Cup in October 2017, beating Brazil 3–1 in the semi-final and Spain 5–2 in the final.

The following year, Cooper's side reached the semi-finals of the 2018 UEFA European U17 Championship, where they lost to Netherlands on penalties. They did not qualify for the quarter-finals of the 2019 UEFA European U17 Championship, despite beating Sweden 3–1 in their final group game. During his time at England, Cooper oversaw a specialised coaching model which included in-possession and out-of-possession coaches. He was also responsible for the coaching programme and curriculum for the under-15s. On training young players, Cooper said, "Sometimes I will talk and tell the players my thoughts, but most of the time I facilitate... that's how players learn, as a modern player. The days are gone, for me, where everything is the coach telling the player, that's finished."

Swansea City
Cooper was appointed head coach of Championship club Swansea City on 13 June 2019 on a three-year contract. His first match was a 2–1 win against Hull City at the Liberty Stadium, with goals from Borja Bastón and Mike van der Hoorn. Cooper was named the EFL's Championship Manager of the Month for August after Swansea's unbeaten start to the season saw them move top of the league, with 16 points from 18. This was Swansea's best start to a season in 41 years.

During the January transfer window, Cooper signed Rhian Brewster, Marc Guéhi and Conor Gallagher (all of whom Cooper had coached in the England set-up) on loan from Liverpool and Chelsea respectively. Following the outbreak of COVID-19 and subsequent pandemic, the Championship season was suspended indefinitely, with Swansea in 11th place and three points from the play-offs. The season restarted on 20 June. On the final day of the season, Swansea beat Reading 4–1 to finish sixth, moving into the play-offs ahead of Nottingham Forest on goal difference. They were defeated by Brentford 3–2 on aggregate in the semi-final.

In his second season, Cooper again led Swansea to the play-offs, despite criticism of his style of play and Swansea's poor form towards the end of the season. They drew 2–2 with Reading on 25 April 2021 to secure their play-off place, with two league games left in the season. This was Cooper's 100th game in charge. Swansea finished 4th in the league but lost the play-off final to Brentford. He left the club by mutual consent in July 2021.

Nottingham Forest
Cooper was appointed head coach at Championship club Nottingham Forest on 21 September 2021 on a two-year contract. At this point, Nottingham Forest were bottom of the division. Cooper improved Forest's style of play by encouraging them to be confident with the ball and attack in greater numbers. He also improved the mentality of the players - fostering a greater sense of togetherness, and instilling a 'big club mentality'. On 29 May 2022, Cooper led Nottingham Forest to promotion to the Premier League, after a 1–0 win over Huddersfield Town in the Championship play-off final at Wembley Stadium.

On 7 October 2022, he signed a new contract with the club until 2025.

Style of coaching

Cooper likes his teams to play with "good organisation and structure". He prefers his teams to control the game by being brave on the ball and confident when passing. Cooper coaches his teams to have tactical discipline; defensively, he prefers his players to regain possession through composure and aggression.

Cooper cites former Barcelona B coach José Segura as his main influence; the pair worked together at Liverpool's academy. Tactically, Cooper likes to deploy a 4–2–3–1 with two holding midfielders and attacking wing-backs. He has also used a 5–3–2 or 3–5–2 formation to ensure greater defensive stability and more flexibility in attack.

Managerial statistics

Honours

Manager
England U17
FIFA U-17 World Cup: 2017
UEFA European Under-17 Championship runner-up: 2017

Nottingham Forest
EFL Championship play-offs: 2022

Individual
EFL Championship Manager of the Month: August 2019, January 2021, April 2022

References

External links
Steve Cooper at the Football Association website

1979 births
Living people
Footballers from Pontypridd
Welsh footballers
Association football defenders
Wrexham A.F.C. players
The New Saints F.C. players
Rhyl F.C. players
Bangor City F.C. players
Porthmadog F.C. players
Cymru Premier players
Welsh football managers
Swansea City A.F.C. managers
Nottingham Forest F.C. managers
English Football League managers
Premier League managers
Association football coaches
Wrexham A.F.C. non-playing staff
Liverpool F.C. non-playing staff